The Kayin People's Party (abbreviated KPP) is a political party in Myanmar (Burma). It was formed by retired Kayin government officers to contest the 2010 general elections. It is based in Yangon where many Karen people are living.

It fielded 41 candidates in the 2010 general elections, winning six seats. It did not run in the 2012 by-elections. In the 2015 general elections it partnered with the Federal Democracy Alliance (FDA), and the Kayin Democratic Party to field over 100 candidates in constituencies across seven states and regions - Yangon, Bago, Tanintharyi, Ayeyarwady, Kayah, Kayin and Mon. Despite this, it retained only a single seat in the Kayin State Hluttaw.

References

Political parties in Myanmar
Political parties established in 2010
2010 establishments in Myanmar